Palace of Dreams is a 1985 Australian fictional mini series about a Jewish family running a hotel in working class inner city of Sydney in the 1930s. Sandra Levy conceived and produced the series, based on her experience of living in a similar hotel run by her Russian Jewish mother during the Great Depression. The main set of the series is Dundee Palace (formerly the Olympic Hotel), on the corner of Regent Street and Moore Park Road, Paddington). It was advertised in newspapers of the time as 'A story of belonging'. It included historical events such as the popularity of Donald Bradman and aviation achievements of Bert Hinkler and Charles Kingsford Smith. It also showed archival footage of the opening of the Sydney Harbour Bridge.

The Fryer Library at the University of Queensland holds the show's manuscripts in the Hanger Collection of Australian Playscripts.

Premise 
The series is based on a hotel owned by the Russian Jewish emigrant family, the Mendels. Parents Chana and Mick Mendel live at the hotel with grandfather, and children Joseph, Ruth and Miriam. Writer Tom Raynor (Michael O'Neill) moves from the family farm and grows close to the Mendel family.

Cast and crew

Episode writers

Awards and nominations 
In 1985, the show was a winner in the annual Television Society of Australia Penguin awards. In 1986, Deirdre Rubenstein won best actress for her role in the show.

References

External links
Palace of Dreams at IMDb
Palace of Dreams at Australian Screen Online

1980s Australian television miniseries
1985 Australian television series debuts
1985 Australian television series endings
1985 television films
1985 films
English-language television shows
Films scored by Chris Neal (songwriter)